Uwe Koschinat (born 1 September 1971) is a German former footballer, who manages Arminia Bielefeld.

Coaching career
Koschinat was an assistant coach at TuS Koblenz. He became the interim head coach for Koblenz on 17 December 2009. Petrik Sander became the next head coach on 27 December 2009. He lost his only match in–charge 1–0 to FSV Frankfurt. Koschinat became head coach of Fortuna Köln on 1 July 2011. He terminated his contract on 15 October 2018, to become the manager of SV Sandhausen. He was sacked on 24 November 2020. On 6 April 2021, 1. FC Saarbrücken announced that they hired Koschinat starting from the 2021–22 season. He left Saarbrücken in October 2022. In March 2023, he was appointed as the new coach for Arminia Bielefeld.

Coaching career

References

External links

1971 births
Living people
German footballers
VfL Wolfsburg players
TuS Koblenz players
German football managers
2. Bundesliga players
SC Fortuna Köln managers
2. Bundesliga managers
3. Liga managers
TuS Koblenz managers
SV Sandhausen managers
1. FC Saarbrücken managers
Arminia Bielefeld managers
Association football defenders
Footballers from Rhineland-Palatinate